Rear Admiral John Oliver Roberts  (born 4 April 1924) is a British former Royal Navy officer who served as  Flag Officer, Naval Air Command.

Naval career
Educated at the Royal Naval College, Dartmouth, Roberts joined the Royal Navy in 1941 at HMS St Vincent during the Second World War. He was given command of 803 Naval Air Squadron on board the aircraft carrier HMS Eagle in 1957 and of the frigate HMS St Bride's Bay in 1960.  He went on to be commanding officer of the Leander Class frigate HMS Galatea in 1966 and commanding officer of the aircraft carrier HMS Ark Royal in 1971. After that he became Flag Officer Sea Training in 1972, Chief of Staff to the Commander-in-Chief Fleet in 1974 and Flag Officer, Naval Air Command in 1976 before retiring in 1978.
 
Roberts was appointed a Companion of the Order of the Bath in the 1976 New Year Honours.

References

 

1924 births
Living people
Companions of the Order of the Bath
Royal Navy rear admirals
Royal Navy personnel of World War II